Gírová is an  mountain in the Silesian Beskids mountain range, in the Moravian-Silesian Region, Czech Republic. The mountain is located several kilometers from the borders with Poland and Slovakia.

It was opened on 16 October 1932 by the Club of Czechoslovak Tourists. Six year afterwards, the hut was rented by Franciszek Schulhauser, who has been administering it until 1967. During the communist era, the hut was owned by several state companies, and was not fully opened to the tourists. It was only on 4 September 1993, when the hut was fully opened.

There are two tourist trails leading to Gírová. One can reach the mountain from Mosty u Jablunkova (Mosty koło Jabłonkowa) and Bukovec (Bukowiec), the second one from Jablunkov (Jabłonków).

Footnotes

References 

 

 

Mountains and hills of the Czech Republic
Silesian Beskids
Populated places in Frýdek-Místek District
Cieszyn Silesia